Tuppe tuppe, Marescià!, also known as È permesso Maresciallo?, is a 1958 Italian comedy film directed by Carlo Ludovico Bragaglia and starring Peppino De Filippo and Giovanna Ralli.

Plot
In Sagliena, Pietro Stelluti has become a marshal of the Carabinieri and greets the photo of his former superior Antonio Carotenuto, now on leave, while his colleague Baiocchi who has been promoted to the lower rank of brigadier remained under his orders. In a dialogue between Stelluti and Baiocchi, it is revealed that the love story with the "Bersagliera" ended badly. Now the young marshal has fallen in love with Maria, a girl who has a bar in the town square, but her shyness prevents him from declaring himself. Meanwhile, Maria is asked in marriage by Percuoco, a mature upstart who has returned to the village after making a fortune in France. Maria rejects the advances of the latter who then, to force her to surrender, opens another place and hires Carmelina, a busty waitress who attracts all of Maria's old customers to the new bar.

Cast 

Peppino De Filippo as Percuoco 
Giovanna Ralli as  Carmelina 
Roberto Risso as  Maresciallo Pietro Stelluti
Lorella De Luca as  Maria 
Aroldo Tieri as Angiolino Angelucci 
 Vittoria Crispo as Mariannina 
Memmo Carotenuto as  Brigadier Baiocchi 
 Maria Paris as  Ninetta
Nino Vingelli as Novità 
Arturo Bragaglia as  The Major
Aldo Bufi Landi as Carabinieri Lieutenant 
 Fulvio Pellegrino as Arnaldo 
Jole Fierro as Rosina
Gildo Bocci as  Client at the Bar 
Bruno Corelli as Client at the Bar 
Renato Terra as  Client at the Bar

References

External links
 

Italian comedy films
1958 comedy films
Films directed by Carlo Ludovico Bragaglia
1950s Italian films